Margaret Lee (born Margaret Gwendolyn Box; 4 August 1943) is a British actress who was a popular leading lady in Italian films in the 1960s and 1970s. She is the mother of production manager/producer Roberto Malerba (from her marriage to Gino Malerba) and production coordinator Damian Anderson.

Early career 
Born in Wolverhampton, England, but raised in London, she was educated at the Italia Conti Theatre School in London, graduating in 1960. She moved to Rome shortly afterwards to pursue a career in films. Her film debut came in the sword and sandal adventure Fire Monsters Against the Son of Hercules (1962), where she played the female lead alongside Reg Lewis, but it was a string of popular comedies that initially made Lee a star in Italy. With a blonde, fluffy look modelled after Marilyn Monroe, Lee spent the first half of the 1960s appearing in numerous Italian comedies and parodies – several of which starred the popular comedic duo Franco and Ciccio. Few of these films received much, if any, distribution in English-speaking territories but they were highly successful in Italy, and made Lee a well-known film actress.

Eurospy films 
Around the mid 1960s, Lee moved away from comedies and started appearing in a long line of Eurospy films, where she was frequently cast as sexy femme fatales. Her appearance also changed as she dropped the blonde Marilyn Monroe-inspired look and became a brunette instead. Some of the most famous Eurospy films Lee starred in were Our Agent Tiger (1965) by Claude Chabrol, Agent 077: From the Orient with Fury (1965) by Sergio Grieco and Kiss the Girls and Make Them Die (1966) by Henry Levin.

International career 
Lee's beauty and talent also caught the eye of international film producer Harry Alan Towers, who gave Lee wider international recognition by casting her in prominent roles in several of his all-star cast productions; starting with the British thriller Circus of Fear (1966), directed by John Llewellyn Moxey. Towers also cast Lee in the spy-comedy Our Man in Marrakesh (1966), directed by Don Sharp; the action film Five Golden Dragons (1967), directed by Jeremy Summers; the thrillers Venus in Furs (1969) and The Bloody Judge (1970), both directed by Jesús Franco; and finally in Dorian Gray (1970), directed by Massimo Dallamano.

Lee's co-star in Circus of Fear, Five Golden Dragons, Coplan Saves His Skin and Venus in Furs was the renowned German actor Klaus Kinski (who was also a regular in Harry Alan Towers productions). The pairing of Lee and Kinski would prove to be very popular among cinema-goers – especially in Italy – so they would continue to act together until the early 1970s; appearing in a total of 12 films together.

Outside of her work for Towers, Lee didn't appear in any further international films but in 1972 she guest starred in the British TV series The Protectors, in the episode "The Numbers Game".

Television 

Margaret Lee was also popular on Italian television in the 1960s; appearing as a showgirl alongside the famous singer Johnny Dorelli. Lee also starred with Dorelli in his film debut Arriva Dorellik, also known as How to Kill 400 Duponts (1967).

Lee also starred as Cinderella in the Italian TV special Il Cenerentola in 1969.

Later career 
By the early 1970s, Lee's movie career had descended further and further into exploitation; culminating in Fernando Di Leo's extremely sleazy and violent thriller Slaughter Hotel (1971). She would eventually disappear from the Italian movie scene in 1974, and return to England. Lee returned to Italy in 1981, however, and made a minor movie comeback in Dino Risi's comedy Sesso e volentieri (1982), which reunited her with her old co-star Johnny Dorelli. But Lee's comeback was to be a short one as she only appeared in one further film, the very obscure crime-comedy Neapolitan Sting (1983), before retiring from movies altogether and moving to the United States.

Filmography 

 Maciste contro i mostri ( Fire Monsters Against the Son of Hercules, 1962)
 I tre nemici (1962)
 Due samurai per cento geishe (1962)
 Totò di notte n. 1 (1962)
 Cleopatra (1963) – uncredited bit part role
 Avventura al motel (1963)
 La ballata dei mariti (1963)
 Gli imbroglioni ( The Swindlers, 1963) dir. by Lucio Fulci
 Sansone contro i pirati ( Samson Against the Pirates, 1963)
 Siamo tutti pomicioni (1963)
 I quattro tassisti (1963)
 Vino whisky e acqua salata ( Wine, Whiskey and Salt Water, 1963)
 Via Veneto (1963)
 Adolescenti al sole (1964)
 Due mattacchioni al Moulin Rouge (1964)
 I due pericoli pubblici ( Two Public Enemies, 1964)
 In ginocchio da te (1964)
 I maniaci ( The Maniacs, 1964) dir. by Lucio Fulci
 I marziani hanno dodici mani ( The Twelve-Handed Men of Mars, 1964)
 Un mostro e mezzo (1964)
 La vedovella (1964)
 Agente 077 dall'oriente con furore ( Agent 077: From the Orient with Fury, 1965)
 Casanova 70 (1965)
 I due sergenti del generale Custer ( Two Sergeants of General Custer, 1965)
 Io uccido, tu uccidi ( I Kill, You Kill, 1965)
 Letti sbagliati (1965)
 Le lit à deux places ( The Double Bed, 1965)
 Il morbidone ( The Dreamer, 1965)
 On a volé la Joconde (1965)
 Questa volta parliamo di uomini ( Let's Talk About Men, 1965)
 Questo pazzo, pazzo mondo della canzone (1965)
 Lo scippo (1965)
 La ragazzola (1965)
 Le tigre se parfume à la dynamite ( Our Agent Tiger, 1965)
 Le carnaval des barbouzes ( Killer's Carnival, 1966)
 Circus of Fear (1966) starring Christopher Lee
 Djurado ( Johnny Golden Poker, 1966)
 Il ladro della Gioconda ( The Mona Lisa Has Been Stolen, 1966)
 New York chiama Superdrago ( Secret Agent Super Dragon, 1966)
 Our Man in Marrakesh (1966)
 Se tutte le donne del mondo ( Kiss the Girls and Make Them Die, 1966)
 Tre notti violente ( Web of Violence, 1966)
 Arrriva Dorellik ( How to Kill 400 Duponts, 1967)
 Colpo maestro al servizio di Sua Maestà britannica ( Master Stroke, 1967)
 Le Tigre sort sans sa mère ( Da Berlino l'apocalisse and Spy Fit, 1967)
 Dick Smart 2007 (1967)
 Five Golden Dragons (1967)
 Franco, Ciccio e le vedove allegre ( Franco, Ciccio and the Cheerful Widows, 1967)
 Action Man (1967)
 Le soleil des voyous (1967)
 Banditi a Milano ( Bandits in Milan, 1968)
 The Cats ( I bastardi, 1968)
 Coplan sauve sa peau ( Coplan Saves His Skin, 1968)
 Pas de roses pour OSS 117 ( OSS 117 – Double Agent, 1968)
 Questi fantasmi ( Ghosts – Italian Style, 1968)
 Cry Chicago ( ¡Viva América! or Mafia Mob, 1969)
 5 per l'inferno ( Five for Hell, 1969)
 A doppia faccia ( Double Face, 1969) starring Klaus Kinski
 Il Cenerentola (1969) – TV special
 House of Pleasure (1969)
 Sai cosa faceva Stalin alle donne? ( What Did Stalin Do to Women?, 1969)
 Un sudario a la medida ( A Candidate for a Killing, 1969)
 Venus in Furs (1969)
 Appuntamento col disonore ( Rendezvous with Dishonour, 1970)
 Dorian Gray (1970)
 The Bloody Judge (1970)
 Bano de sangre ( Blood Bath) – unreleased
 Le belve (1971)
 La bestia uccide a sangue freddo ( Slaughter Hotel, 1971)
 Nokaut ( The Rogue, 1971)
 Papesatan, papesatan aleppe (1973)
 Gli assassini sono nostri ospiti ( The Killers Are Our Guests, 1974)
 La sensualità è un attimo di vita (1974)
 Sesso e volentieri (1982)
 Stangata napoletana ( Neapolitan Sting, 1983)

References

External links

1943 births
Living people
Actors from Wolverhampton
English film actresses
Alumni of the Italia Conti Academy of Theatre Arts